Dato' Wira Amiruddin bin Hamzah (Jawi: أميرالدين بن حمزة; born 20 April 1962) is a Malaysian politician. He has been a member and Secretary-General of the Homeland Fighters' Party (PEJUANG) since its formation in August 2020 and was a member of the Malaysian United Indigenous Party (BERSATU). He has also served as the Member of Parliament (MP) for Kubang Pasu from May 2018 until November 2022. He served as Deputy Minister of Finance in the Pakatan Harapan (PH) administration from July 2018 to its implosion in February 2020.

Amiruddin had previously served as the Leader of the Opposition in the Kedah State Legislative Assembly for the Pan-Malaysian Islamic Party before leaving for BERSATU in 2017. His decision was caused by PAS' exit from the Pakatan Harapan coalition.

Amiruddin is married to Nora Mohamed Noor.

Election results

Honours
  :
  Knight Companion of the Order of Loyalty to the Royal House of Kedah (DSDK) – Dato' (2009)
  Knight Commander of the Order of the Crown of Kedah (DGMK) – Dato' Wira (2019)

External links

References 

 

1962 births
Living people
Malaysian people of Malay descent
Malaysian Muslims
Former Malaysian United Indigenous Party politicians
Former Malaysian Islamic Party politicians
Members of the Dewan Rakyat
Members of the Kedah State Legislative Assembly
Kedah state executive councillors
21st-century Malaysian politicians